Tau Devi Lal Stadium is a multi-purpose sports complex located in Gurgaon within the state of Haryana, India. The Tau Devi Lal Football Stadium has a capacity of 12,000 and the Tau Devi Lal Cricket Stadium has a capacity of 7,000.

The site currently consists of two sports venues in addition to several practice facilities: the Tau Devi Lal Cricket Ground and the Tau Devi Lal Football Stadium.

It is the home ground of I-League side RoundGlass Punjab FC, and on occasion the Haryana cricket team.

Cricket

The stadium hosts first-class matches for Haryana cricket team. It has floodlight facilities. The end names of the stadium are City End, Pioneer Urban End. The stadium is located in Sohna Road, Sector 38 in Gurgaon.
The stadium has hosted a Women's ODI between India and West Indies in 2004. The match was won by India by 170 runs as Aru Kirkire scored a century and then Mamatha Maben took 4 wickets.
The stadium was one of three venues which hosted unauthorized Indian Cricket League in 2008. The stadium has hosted 14 T-20 games of the league.now a new league of mind tree school will be held on 20 August 2016.

Football
On 23 March 2011 Afghanistan played vs Bhutan in 2012 AFC Challenge Cup qualification which was won by Afghanistan 3–0. Sidiq Walizada of Afghanistan scored 3 Goals for Afghanistan in 2', 36', 80th minutes of the match. Total attendance was around 200 including around 50 Afghans .

Again on 25 March 2011 Afghanistan played vs Bhutan in 2012 AFC Challenge Cup qualification which was won by Afghanistan 2–0. Waheed Nadeem and Israfeel Kohistani of Afghanistan scored one Goal each in 60' and 64th minutes of the match. Total attendance was around 2,000 including around 200 Afghans.

The stadium was also used by Minerva Punjab FC for their home matches of I-League for a season.

References

Football venues in Haryana
Multi-purpose stadiums in India
Sports venues in Haryana
Sport in Gurgaon
Buildings and structures in Gurgaon
Cricket grounds in Haryana
Indian Cricket League stadiums
2000 establishments in Haryana
Sports venues completed in 2000